The Kavana Cooperative is an independent Jewish community in Seattle, Washington, formed in 2006. The community is pluralistic and non-denominational. It is based on a cooperative model, where partners and participants take on the responsibility for actively creating a Jewish life for the group. It hosts educational, religious, and social programs for adults and families.

Rabbi Rachel Nussbaum is the organization's spiritual leader.

Awards 
The cooperative received the Levitan Innovation Award in 2006. In 2007, Kavana was named one of North America's most innovative nonprofit organizations in Slingshot '07-'08, a guidebook published by the Andrea and Charles Bronfman Philanthropies. Additionally, Kavana received a 2007-2008 grant from the Legacy Heritage Fund for its "Prep and Practice" program. In 2009, Kavana was named one of the Top 25 Most Vibrant Congregations by Newsweek.

Newsweek named Nussbaum one of the Top 25 Pulpit Rabbis in America in 2008. Nussbaum was again named one of America's Top 50 Most Influential Rabbis by Newsweek and Daily Beast in 2011.

See also
Judaism
Chavurah

References

External links
Kavana Cooperative Official Website
Newsweek's Top 25 Pulpit Rabbis in America
JT News: Kavana Receives National Recognition
Press Release: Kavana Cooperative Named One of North America’s 50 Most Innovative Jewish Nonprofits in the Third Annual "Slingshot" Guidebook
Seattle Times: Queen Anne Jewish Community Goes Its Own Way
The Guide to Jewish Washington: The Kavana Cooperative
'Emerging' communities receive microgrants
Religion News: New congregations see ’Net results in communication and cost savings

Jewish organizations based in the United States
Unaffiliated synagogues in the United States
Jews and Judaism in Seattle
2006 establishments in Washington (state)
Jewish organizations established in 2006